A by-election was held for the New South Wales Legislative Assembly electorate of Wollondilly on 19 July 1913, following the death of William McCourt.

Dates

Result

William McCourt died.

See also
Electoral results for the district of Wollondilly
List of New South Wales state by-elections

Notes

References

1913 elections in Australia
New South Wales state by-elections
1910s in New South Wales
July 1913 events